The Nemadji River is a river rising in Pine County, Minnesota, United States, which flows through Carlton County, Minnesota, and Douglas County, Wisconsin, to Lake Superior. The Nemadji River empties into Lake Superior in an industrial neighborhood at Allouez Bay in the city of Superior's east-side neighborhood of Allouez and Wisconsin Point.

Course
Most of the rivers' length flows in Douglas County, Wisconsin, entering near Foxboro and exiting in East End, Superior, near Loons Foot Boat Landing, USH 2/53, and the BNSF Taconite Plant

History
Nemadji comes from the Ojibwe language, "ne-madji-tic-guay-och" (Namanjinik-tigweyaag in the current spelling), meaning "left-hand river,"  opposed to the Saint Louis River, which when viewed from Allouez Bay is the "right-hand river."

In the 1992 Nemadji River train derailment a Burlington Northern train derailed south of Superior, releasing nearly 22,000 gallons of aromatic hydrocarbons including liquid benzene, a highly toxic chemical, into the Nemadji River. Fish, wildlife, and other resources were severely affected by the incident. In March 2004, the U.S. Fish and Wildlife Service proposed a draft that would use funds received from a settlement with Burlington Northern to restore a portion of the Lake Superior basin affected by the incident. The river runs through the City of Superior, Town of Summit, Town of Superior, and the counties of Douglas, Carlton, Pine.

See also
 List of rivers of Minnesota
 List of longest streams of Minnesota

References

Further reading

External links

 Nemadji River Basin Project, Carlton Co. SWCD
Nemadji River Home Page
Restoration Plan and Environmental Assessment for Natural Resource Injuries Resulting from the Nemadji River Spill
Columbia Gazetteer - Nemadji River, 

Rivers of Minnesota
Rivers of Wisconsin
Tributaries of Lake Superior
Rivers of Pine County, Minnesota
Rivers of Carlton County, Minnesota
Rivers of Douglas County, Wisconsin
Northern Minnesota trout streams